Aadam Ismaeel Khamis is a long-distance runner now representing Bahrain after his switch from Kenya.

According to Bahraini officials, he was born Hosea Kosgei on 12 February 1989 in Kenya. Like fellow Bahraini runners Belal Mansoor Ali and Tareq Mubarak Taher, his age is surrounded by controversy. In August 2005 the IAAF opened an investigation on their ages which was still ongoing .

In 2006 Khamis won a bronze medal over 3000 metres at the Asian Indoor Athletics Championships. At the World Junior Championships in Beijing the same year he won a bronze in 10,000 metres and finished fifth in 5000 metres. The IAAF Council opened an investigatory disciplinary file on Khamis the day after his 5000 m finish.

References

External links
 

1989 births
Living people
Bahraini male long-distance runners
Kenyan male long-distance runners
Olympic athletes of Bahrain
Athletes (track and field) at the 2008 Summer Olympics
Asian Games medalists in athletics (track and field)
Athletes (track and field) at the 2006 Asian Games
Athletes (track and field) at the 2014 Asian Games
Kenyan emigrants to Bahrain
Naturalized citizens of Bahrain
Bahraini people of Kenyan descent
World Athletics Championships athletes for Bahrain
Asian Games bronze medalists for Bahrain
Medalists at the 2006 Asian Games